The Teatro D. Pedro II was a theatre in Rio de Janeiro, Brazil, and named after Dom Pedro II, monarch of Brazil at the time. The theatre was inaugurated in 1871, and received the name of Teatro Imperial D. Pedro II in 1875.

In 1890, after the proclamation of the Republic of Brazil, the theatre was renamed Teatro Lyrico. The building was demolished in 1934.

Theatres in Rio de Janeiro (city)
Opera houses in Brazil
Demolished buildings and structures in Brazil
Theatres completed in 1871